William Buschmann Block, also known as the Buschmann Block, is a historic commercial building located at Indianapolis, Indiana.  It was built in 1870–1871, and is a three-story, "L"-shaped, Italianate style brick building. It was enlarged with a four-story wing about 1879. It sits on a rubble foundation and has round arched openings with limestone lintels. The building originally housed a retail and wholesale grocery business.

It was listed on the National Register of Historic Places in 1988. It is located in the St. Joseph Neighborhood Historic District.

References

Individually listed contributing properties to historic districts on the National Register in Indiana
Commercial buildings on the National Register of Historic Places in Indiana
Italianate architecture in Indiana
Commercial buildings completed in 1879
Commercial buildings in Indianapolis
National Register of Historic Places in Indianapolis